Hruškarje is a settlement in the hills northeast of Cerknica in the Inner Carniola region of Slovenia.

References

External links

Hruškarje on Geopedia

Populated places in the Municipality of Cerknica